Charles Grayson Gilbert (born February 1, 1990) is an American entrepreneur and cancer survivor.

In October 1995, he was the fifth ever child in recorded medical history to be diagnosed with a rare form of pancreatic cancer known as pancreatoblastoma. A pancreaticoduodenectomy, or Whipple's Procedure, was successful.  He was given less than a 2% chance of survival at the time of his diagnosis but was declared cancer-free on July 1, 1996. Since, he has gone on to represent the Children's Miracle Network and Johns Hopkins Hospital in various non-profit and public benefit events and fundraisers, and remains a public and inspirational speaker on behalf of both organizations.

On January 1, 2012, Gilbert announced the creation of the Inspirational Medicine Foundation, a Maryland-based non-profit dedicated to "connecting sick children with their heroes." Since then, his work with the Foundation has received kudos from the  national press, such as The Huffington Post, which named Gilbert as "Greatest Person of the Day" and has received both collegiate and Maryland based media exposure.

References

External links

 http://www.baltimoresun.com/entertainment/sun-magazine/bs-sm-cancer-survivor-20110522,0,7705750,full.story
 http://www.hopkinschildrens.org/Grayson-Gilbert-My-Lifetime_Commitment-to-Hopkins-Childrens.aspx
 https://archive.today/20120710200607/http://cdange2.wordpress.com/about/tigerthon-2010/

1990 births
Living people